Brandon Anthony Pereira (born April 30, 1996) is a Canadian field hockey player who plays as a defender for United Brothers and the Canadian national team.

International career
Pereira represented Canada at two Junior World Cups: 2013 in New Delhi and 2016 in Lucknow. He captained the Canadian team that won the silver medal at the 2014 Youth Olympics in Nanjing, China. He was part of the national team that clinched silver at the 2017 Men's Pan American Cup in Lancaster, United States. He was selected for the 2018 World Cup, but he only played one game because he picked up an injury in the first match. In June 2019, he was selected in the Canada squad for the 2019 Pan American Games. They won the silver medal as they lost 5–2 to Argentina in the final.

Personal life
Pereira was born on 30 April 1996 in Surrey, British Columbia. His grandfather played field hockey for Uganda at the 1972 Olympics, while his father also played the sport.

As of April 2016, having completed level 1 course to be an electrician, Pereira is working with a contractor.

References

External links

Brandon Pereira at Field Hockey Canada

1996 births
Living people
Field hockey people from British Columbia
Sportspeople from Surrey, British Columbia
Canadian sportspeople of Indian descent
Canadian people of Goan descent
Canadian male field hockey players
Male field hockey defenders
Field hockey players at the 2014 Summer Youth Olympics
Field hockey players at the 2020 Summer Olympics
Olympic field hockey players of Canada
Field hockey players at the 2018 Commonwealth Games
2018 Men's Hockey World Cup players
Field hockey players at the 2019 Pan American Games
Pan American Games silver medalists for Canada
Pan American Games medalists in field hockey
Medalists at the 2019 Pan American Games
Commonwealth Games competitors for Canada
Youth Olympic silver medalists for Canada